Abdul Majid Hassan (1380–1408 CE), also known as Maharaja Karna, allegedly was the second Sultan of Brunei. He may have ascended the Brunei throne in 1402.

He was never mentioned in Salasilah Raja-Raja Brunei. A ruler from Boni named Ma Na Re Jia Na (麻那惹加那) is recorded in the Ming historical record. He sent a mission to China in 1406. The Brunei History Centre suggests that this was the Brunei sultan Abdul Majid Hassan, but there is so far no evidence for this assumption.

In 1408, he went to China and died in Nanjing at the age of 28, leaving a 4-year-old prince named Xiawang (遐旺). He was buried in Nanjing. His tomb is now a tourist attraction.

See also
 List of Sultans of Brunei
 Sultanate of Brunei
 Tomb of the King of Boni

References

External links
 Sultan-Sultan Brunei
 tomb of an ancient Ruler of Brunei

Burials in Nanjing
15th-century Sultans of Brunei